

This is a list of the National Register of Historic Places listings in Big Stone County, Minnesota.  It is intended to be a complete list of the properties and districts on the National Register of Historic Places in Big Stone County, Minnesota, United States.  Latitude and longitude coordinates are provided for many National Register properties and districts; these locations may be seen together in an online map.

There are 8 properties and districts listed on the National Register in the county.  A supplementary list includes two sites that were formerly listed on the National Register.

Current listings

|}

Former listing

|}

See also
 List of National Historic Landmarks in Minnesota
 National Register of Historic Places listings in Minnesota

References

External links

 Minnesota National Register Properties Database—Minnesota Historical Society

Big Stone